Elite is a space trading video game series created by David Braben.

Games 
The first game in the series was Elite, released in 1984. Three official sequels have been created: Frontier: Elite II (1993) and Frontier: First Encounters (Elite III) (1995), both produced by Braben's company Frontier Developments.  A third sequel, Elite Dangerous (conceived in 1998, provisionally titled Elite 4), was successfully crowdfunded initially through a Kickstarter campaign in late 2012, and released in December 2014.

Both Frontier games featured many technical advancements and new features on the original Elite, including filled 3D graphics, missions and a complex economy. This time, the player was not confined to orbit but could land on and explore or mine planets. The number of flyable ships was greatly increased, and a new political backstory was introduced enabling the player to gain ranks in competing interstellar empires. Frontier Elite II appeared on the Amiga, Atari ST, and IBM PC compatibles whilst Frontier: First Encounters was only released for IBM PC.

The two Frontier games were considered significantly flawed in a number of respects. Both games had many bugs, First Encounters in particular, due apparently to being published in an incomplete state. First Encounters was extensively patched, then reissued and finally withdrawn from sale.  This was followed by a lawsuit brought by Gametek against David Braben. The two games employed a realistic flight model based on Newtonian mechanics rather than the original arcade-style engine. While this was more realistic, many players also found it frustratingly difficult, particularly in combat. Most space trading games since Elite have stuck to an arcade-style flight model, in which the ships behave as though they are flying in an atmosphere.

Elite Dangerous, which was released over twenty years after First Encounters, added multiplayer and extended the use of procedural generation, allowing players to fly to and survey every non-atmospheric planet of a certain size range and temperature range in a galaxy containing billions of stars. Elite Dangerous also offers both a Newtonian flight model as well as an arcade one, with the player being able to choose between them using 'flight assist.'

References 

 
Video game franchises introduced in 1984